Leonard Renfro (born June 29, 1970 in Detroit, Michigan) is a former professional American football defensive tackle who played two seasons for the Philadelphia Eagles in the National Football League.

References

1970 births
Living people
American football defensive tackles
Colorado Buffaloes football players
Philadelphia Eagles players
Players of American football from Detroit